Ciao Alberto is a 2021 American computer-animated short film written and directed by McKenna Jean Harris, produced by Pixar Animation Studios, and distributed by Walt Disney Studios Motion Pictures. Set after the events of the 2021 Pixar film Luca, the short was released on November 12, 2021, on Disney+. Like the movie, it received generally positive reviews from critics, with praise for its animation, humor, and emotional weight, with positive messages being well-received.

Plot 
After receiving a new letter from Luca about how life at school in Genoa is, Alberto writes back about how he has become a good "employee" to Massimo and has been helping him with fish deliveries. Despite his enthusiasm, Massimo barely talks to him personally except to warn him against being in their fishing boat without his supervision. It quickly becomes apparent that Alberto is seeking approval from Massimo, but is concerned about being "fired" for some of his mistakes.

Alberto tries to deliver caught fish efficiently but keeps tossing them to the wrong people. He tries to cook lunch for Massimo but makes a mess of the whole kitchen. While Massimo tries to converse with a customer, Alberto tries to lift a whole barrel of fish, only to be pressured by the weight. Massimo rushes to save him but ends up falling into the water with the barrel, losing their day's catch.

Alberto sneaks out at night to catch more fish but is followed by Machiavelli to the boat. After getting frightened by him, he drops his lantern and realizes that he accidentally set the boat on fire. They escape just as Massimo comes out to see the damage. He does not utter a word.

Upset by his inability to impress Massimo, Alberto packs up his things to leave, but Massimo rushes out to stop him, admitting that it was a mistake. As Alberto tells him to leave him alone, he accidentally calls him "dad", which shocks both of them. Massimo reveals that he once made his father so angry that he punched through a brick wall, but that they made up by patching it up together.

The next day, Massimo and Alberto, now communicating a lot better, work on fixing the boat as they finally share stories with each other.

Voice cast 
 Jack Dylan Grazer as Alberto Scorfano, Massimo's adopted son and Luca's best friend
 Marco Barricelli as Massimo Marcovaldo, Alberto's adopted father
 Jacob Tremblay as Luca Paguro, Alberto's best friend
 Gino La Monica
 Arturo Sorino

Development 
Ciao Alberto was directed by McKenna Jean Harris and produced by Matt DeMartini with Enrico Casarosa as an executive producer.

Music 
Dan Romer, who composed the music for the Pixar film Luca, composed the music for Ciao Alberto. The score was released on November 12, 2021.

Track listing

Release 
Ciao Alberto was released on November 12, 2021, as a Disney+ exclusive short film.

Reception

Audience viewership 
According to Whip Media, Ciao Alberto was the 8th most watched film across all platforms in the United States, during the week of November 14, 2022.

Critical reception 
Jennifer Roy of CBR.com found the short film to be an example of how communication matters between a parent and a child to build a strong bond, stating, "While Luca did subtextually set up Massimo as Alberto's new parental figure, Ciao Alberto makes this subtext text and shows that a large part of parenting is learning to adapt to each individual child's needs to make sure they feel supported and loved unconditionally." Jay Snook of The Good Men Project complimented the humor of the short film. Stephanie Morgan of Common Sense Media gave the short a 4 out of 5, praised the short film for the depiction of positive messages and role models, citing communication and perseverance, and complimented the diverse representations, writing, "Kids will love the silly adventures, while parents will appreciate the social-emotional lessons, like how Massimo learns to become a better communicator in order to improve his relationship with Alberto."

Accolades

References

External links 

2020s animated short films
2020s Disney animated short films
2020s English-language films
2021 animated films
2021 short films
American animated short films
Children's and Family Emmy Award winners
Disney+ original films
Films scored by Dan Romer
Films set in Genoa
Films set in Italy
Pixar short films